The 2017 FIBA Women's Asia Cup was the qualifying tournament for FIBA Asia and FIBA Oceania at the 2018 FIBA Women's Basketball World Cup in Spain. The tournament was held from 23 to 29 July in Bangalore, India. Before this edition, the tournament was known as the FIBA Asia Championship for Women, and only involved FIBA Asia members. FIBA Oceania teams Australia and New Zealand, as well as Fiji (at Division B) competed in the tournament for the first time.

Japan won their fourth title after defeating Australia 74–73 in the final, while China captured the bronze medal by defeating South Korea 75–51. These four countries qualified for 2018 FIBA Women's Basketball World Cup.

Venue

Qualifiers
For Division A:
Semifinalists at the 2015 FIBA Asia Women's Championship:

Qualifying round winners at the 2015 FIBA Asia Women's Championship:

Teams from FIBA Oceania:

For Division B:
The host nation, being relegated to Division B at the previous championship:

Early registrants for the Division B slots from FIBA Asia:

Finalists of the Women's Basketball Final at the 2015 Pacific Games:

 (withdrew)

Competition format
The tournament composed of two divisions, Division A and Division B.

For each division, during the Group Phase, eight participating teams were divided into two groups (A and B) of four teams each. Each team played all the other teams in its own group (a total of three games for each team), and all four teams in each group advanced to their division's Quarter-finals. A total of twelve games were played in the Group Phase.

During the Final Phase, Quarter-finals games were decided on the ranking of the participating teams in the Group Phase:

Game 13: 1st A v 4th B
Game 14: 2nd B v 3rd B
Game 15: 3rd A v 2nd B
Game 16: 4th A v 1st B

For Division A, the four winners advanced to the Semi-finals and to the 2018 FIBA Women's Basketball World Cup.

Meanwhile, the four losing quarterfinalists went on to play 5th-8th Classification Games wherein the two winners advanced to play 5-6 Classification Game, while the two losers played 7-8 Classification Game

During the Semi-finals, the four teams played as follows:

Game 21: Winner of Game 13 v Winner of Game 14
Game 22: Winner of Game 15 v Winner of Game 16

In determining the Champions and the Third Place winner, the four teams played as follows:

Game 23: Loser of Game 21 v Loser of Game 22
Game 24: Winner of Game 21 v Winner of Game 22

Divisions
Division A included teams that won in the 2015 qualifying round and the semifinalists of the previous championship. FIBA Oceania teams  and  competed in the tournament for the first time and were placed in the same division.

Included were the FIBA World Rankings prior to the draw.

* Withdrew.

Draw
The official draw ceremony was held on 17 May 2017 in Krishna Hall, Bengaluru.

Squads

Division A
All times are local (UTC+05:30)

Preliminary round

Group A

Group B

Knockout round

Bracket

5th place bracket

Quarterfinals

5–8th place semifinals

Semifinals

Seventh place game

Fifth place game

Third place game

Final

Final standing

Statistics and awards

Statistical leaders

Points

Rebounds

Assists

Blocks

Steals

Awards
Most Valuable Player
  Kelsey Griffin

All-Tournament Team
  Manami Fujioka
  Lim Yung-hui
  Moeko Nagaoka
  Kelsey Griffin
  Li Yueru

Division B
All times are local (UTC+05:30)

Preliminary round

Group A
American Samoa withdrew from competition.

Group B

Knockout round

Bracket

5th place bracket

Quarterfinals

5–8th place semifinal

Semifinals

Fifth place game

Third place game

Final

Final standing

Notes

References

External links
Official website

Bask
2017 in women's basketball
women
2017
International women's basketball competitions hosted by India
July 2017 sports events in Asia